The 2012–13 Missouri State Bears basketball team represented Missouri State University during the 2012–13 NCAA Division I men's basketball season. The Bears, led by second year head coach Paul Lusk, played their home games at JQH Arena and were members of the Missouri Valley Conference. They finished the season 11–22, 7–11 in MVC play to finish in a three-way tie for seventh place. They lost in the quarterfinals of the Missouri Valley tournament to Wichita State.

Roster

Schedule

|-
!colspan=9| Costa Rica Foreign Tour

|-
!colspan=9| Exhibition

|-
!colspan=9| Regular season

|-
!colspan=9| Missouri Valley Conference tournament

References

Missouri State Bears basketball seasons
Missouri State